The tumuli of Cekeen are located in the Diourbel Department of the Diourbel Region. The Diourbel Region and the city of Diourbel were part of the precolonial Kingdom of Baol, now part of present-day Senegal.

Purpose
In this area, a tumulus was used as a burial mound for chiefs.  A deceased chief would be joined by other members of his court along with important objects such as furniture and other implements.  In this case, he and his escort would be situated in the chief's hut, whereupon the hut was buried with soil and rocks. Thousands of such tumuli exist in Senegal, but it is in Cekeen that the biggest and most densely scattered occur.

World Heritage Status 

This site was added to the UNESCO World Heritage Tentative List on November 18, 2005 in the Cultural category.

See also
 Senegambian stone circles
 History of Senegal
 History of the Gambia

References 

Serer history
History of Senegal
World Heritage Tentative List for Senegal
Prehistoric Africa
Archaeological sites in Senegal
Tumuli
Archaeology of Western Africa